The Autobiography of Supertramp is the first greatest hits album by the English rock band Supertramp, released in 1986.

The compilation features the most popular songs from the albums Crime of the Century, Even in the Quietest Moments, Breakfast in America, ...Famous Last Words..., and Brother Where You Bound. The CD version and the 2001 remaster also include a song from Crisis? What Crisis?. The album Paris is completely unrepresented, despite its including the hit live version of "Dreamer".

The cover art shows a suit-wearing, faceless man seated in a train carriage reading a book with his own face on the cover. The view from the train window shows the platform with stylised versions of the cover art from three of Supertramp's albums.

The album was also released in the US as Classics, Volume 9, part of A&M's 25th Anniversary series (1987).  That version of the album includes three extra tracks.

The album was re-released as The Very Best of Supertramp in 1990 (2001 in the U.S.) with the bonus track "School" as the first track instead of "Goodbye Stranger" which follows afterwards.

Reception

AllMusic's retrospective review commented that The Very Best of Supertramp is a superior compilation with its choice of tracks.

Track listing

All songs written by Rick Davies and Roger Hodgson, except where noted.

Original release

LP album
"Goodbye Stranger" (Single edit, from Breakfast in America, 1979) – 4:25
"The Logical Song" (Single edit, from Breakfast in America) – 3:45
"Bloody Well Right" (Single edit, from Crime of the Century, 1974) – 4:16
"Breakfast in America" (from Breakfast in America) – 2:37
"Take the Long Way Home" (Single edit, from Breakfast in America) – 4:03
"Crime of the Century" (Early fade-out, from Crime of the Century)– 5:20
"Dreamer" (from Crime of the Century) – 3:19
"From Now On" (from Even in the Quietest Moments..., 1977) – 6:10
"Give a Little Bit" (from Even in the Quietest Moments...) – 4:03
"It's Raining Again" (from ...Famous Last Words..., 1982) – 4:25
"Cannonball" (Single edit, from Brother Where You Bound, 1985) (Davies) – 4:47

Compact disc (Issued as A&M Classics, Volume 9 in the U.S. and Canada)

"Goodbye Stranger" (Single edit) – 4:29
"The Logical Song" (Single edit) – 3:47
"Bloody Well Right" (Single edit) – 4:17
"Breakfast in America" – 2:38
"Rudy" (from Crime of the Century) – 7:17
"Take the Long Way Home" (Single edit) – 4:06
"Crime of the Century" –  5:32
"Dreamer" – 3:31
"Ain't Nobody But Me" (from Crisis? What Crisis?, 1975) – 5:07
"Hide in Your Shell" (from Crime of the Century) – 6:47
"From Now On" – 6:10
"Give a Little Bit" – 4:08
"It's Raining Again" – 4:23
"Cannonball" (Single edit) (Davies) – 4:51

The Very Best of Supertramp
"School" (from Crime of the Century) – 5:35
"Goodbye Stranger" – 5:50
"The Logical Song" – 4:10
"Bloody Well Right" – 4:31
"Breakfast in America" – 2:37
"Rudy" – 7:19
"Take the Long Way Home" – 5:08
"Crime of the Century" – 5:36
"Dreamer" – 3:31
"Ain't Nobody But Me" – 5:14
"Hide in Your Shell" – 6:48
"From Now On" – 6:21
"Give a Little Bit" – 4:08
"It's Raining Again" – 4:25
"Cannonball" (Davies) – 7:38

Personnel
Supertramp
Rick Davies - keyboard, harmonica, vocals
Roger Hodgson (except on "Cannonball") - guitar, keyboards, vocals
Dougie Thomson - bass
John Helliwell - saxophone, woodwinds, keyboards, glockenspiel
Bob Siebenberg -  drums, percussion

Additional musicians
Slyde Hyde - trombone on "Breakfast in America"
Marty Walsh – guitar on "Cannonball"
Doug Wintz – trombone on "Cannonball"

Production
Producers: Ken Scott, Peter Henderson, David Kershenbaum and Supertramp
Mastering: Bernie Grundman, Norman Hall - Bernie Grundman Mastering, Inc.
Cover design: Richard Frankel, Norman Moore
Photography: Ron Slenzak
Poster illustrations: Holly Hollington

Charts

Weekly charts

Year-end charts

Certifications and sales

References

Albums produced by Ken Scott
1986 greatest hits albums
Supertramp compilation albums
A&M Records compilation albums
Albums produced by David Kershenbaum